BLK was a monthly American newsmagazine, similar in format to Time and The Advocate, which targeted its coverage of people, events and issues to African-American LGBT readers.

Published in Los Angeles, the magazine was initially distributed free to local black establishments frequented by lesbians and gay men, but distribution rapidly expanded to nearly all LGBT venues in Greater Los Angeles. Its early coverage of the local black LGBT scene soon enlarged to a nationwide and international focus, and eventually to national and Canadian distribution.

Sub-titled "The National Black Lesbian and Gay Newsmagazine", with the motto "where the news is colored on purpose", BLK (always capitalized) took its name from the standard abbreviation used in U.S. personal ads for "black", i.e. a person of sub-Saharan racial descent.

History 
Alan Bell, an African-American graphic designer who had published Gaysweek for three years in New York City during the late 1970s, was urged to start a news periodical for black lesbians and gay men by black LGBT AIDS activists such as Phill Wilson. But at first he resisted renewing a commitment to professional publishing. Bell had, however, founded Black Jack, a black gay men's safer sex club, in Los Angeles. It was not long before the dearth of reliable information in print about African-American LGBTs and about the HIV crisis among them evoked his efforts to fill an unmet need. Eventually he concluded that the natural next step from the eight-page newsletter he found himself producing monthly for members of Black Jack was expansion, and BLK was born. Bell set out to establish BLK as a regular, predominantly hard news alternative to the infotainment-oriented publications that intermittently appeared in America's black gay communities.

Bell chose the magazine's name to adhere to a tradition among national African-American publications of employing racially indicative titles (e.g., Ebony, Jet, Onyx, Sepia). Initially pronounced as is the word "black", use of the initials in spoken English gradually became customary.

Beginning as a 16-page black-and-white newsprint throwaway in 1988, it had grown to 40 pages with glossy color covers, paid circulation, and national product advertising by the time it ceased publication in mid-1994.

Content and coverage 
Although the first issue had a beefcake cover (a muscular black man clad only in the traditional Santa's hat and whiskers, shown with the magazine's coyly-placed logo), subsequent covers usually pictured a prominent African-American LGBT featured in the "BLK Interview" or photographically illustrated a theme of the month.

Among those interviewed were singer Patti LaBelle (August 1990); porn star Randy Cochran (March 1989); poet Audre Lorde (April 1989); Carl Bean, founder of the Minority AIDS Project and of the Unity Fellowship Church (July 1989), Black AIDS Institute founder Phill Wilson (October 1990); Amassi and BMX founder Cleo Manago (March 1990); documentary-maker Marlon Riggs (April 1990); and Marjorie Hill, CEO of Gay Men's Health Crisis (August 1990).

Complete list of cover stories

Sister publications 
The company that published BLK also published several other titles directed to the black LGBT community including Blackfire, an erotic magazine for men; Black Lace, an erotic magazine for women; Kuumba, a co-sexual poetry journal; Black Dates, a calendar of events for Southern California and The BLK Guide to Southern California for Black People in the Life. In 1999, the company acquired Mentor, a gay non-black publication focusing on (legal, adult) intergenerational relationships. Blackfire and Kuumba remain in publication.

See also
 African-American culture and sexual orientation

External links
Alan Bell Collection, African American Research Library and Cultural Center, Broward County Library

References

African-American magazines
LGBT-related magazines published in the United States
Monthly magazines published in the United States
News magazines published in the United States
Defunct magazines published in the United States
LGBT African-American culture
Magazines established in 1988
Magazines disestablished in 1994
Magazines published in Los Angeles
Free magazines